Glazypeau may refer to:

Glazypeau Creek, in Garland County, Arkansas
Glazypeau Mountain, in Garland County, Arkansas